Dasht-e Murd or Dasht-e Mowrd may refer to:
 Dasht-e Murd, Mahur, Mamasani County, Fars Province
 Dasht-e Murd, Mishan, Mamasani County, Fars Province
 Dasht-e Mowrd, Kohgiluyeh and Boyer-Ahmad